Kamovci is a small village on the road from Dobrovnik to Lendava in the Prekmurje region of Slovenia, right on the border with Hungary.

References

External links
Kamovci Geopedia

Populated places in the Municipality of Lendava